The French Socialist Party (PSF) was a socialist political party founded in 1902.

The PSF came from the merger of the possibilist Federation of the Socialist Workers of France (FTSF), Jean Allemane's Revolutionary Socialist Workers' Party (POSR) and some independent socialist politicians like Jean Jaurès, who went on to become the party leader. Unlike the Socialist Party of France led by Jules Guesde, the PSF supported the principle of the alliance with the non-socialist left in the Bloc des gauches.

Under pressure from the Second International, the two parties merged into the French Section of the Workers' International in 1905.

References 

Defunct political parties in France
Political parties of the French Third Republic
Socialist parties in France
Second International
1902 establishments in France
Political parties established in 1902
1905 disestablishments in France
Political parties disestablished in 1905
Jean Jaurès